Ardıçlı is a Turkic place name that may refer to the following places:

Azerbaijan
 Ardıclı, a village in Lachin Rayon

Turkey
 Ardıçlı, Gercüş, a village in the district of Gercüş, Batman Province
 Ardıçlı, İspir
 Ardıçlı, Murgul, a village in the district of Murgul, Artvin Province
 Ardıçlı, Pasinler
 Ardıçlı, Savaştepe, a village
 Ardıçlı, Tarsus, a village in the district of Tarsus, Mersin Province
 Ardıçlıtaş, a village in the district of Bozyazı, Mersin Province